The Cream & the Crock is a music video album by the Australian rock band You Am I issued on DVD on 10 November 2003. It peaked at No. 14 on the ARIA Top 40 DVD chart. It compiles 19 of their official music videos for tracks from their first studio album, Sound as Ever (October 1993) up to their sixth, Deliverance (September 2002). It also has live performances, TV appearances, interviews, commentaries on the music videos and a specially-made documentary. It was released as a partner to the band's CD best-of compilation double album, The Cream & the Crock (September 2003).

Track listing

Music videos

 Adam's Ribs
 Berlin Chair
 Jaimme's Got a Gal
 Cathy's Clown
 Jewels and Bullets
 Purple Sneakers
 Ken (The Mother Nature's Son)
 Soldiers
 Good Mornin'
 Tuesday
 Trike
 What I Don't Know 'bout You
 Rumble
 Heavy Heart (previously unseen band performance version)
 Damage
 Get Up
 Kick a Hole in the Sky
 Who Put the Devil in You
 Deliverance

Live footage

 Cathy's Clown (Live at Sydney Opera House - 1996)
 Mr Milk (Live at Sydney Opera House - 1996)
 Trike (Live at Wodonga Civic Centre - 1997)
 Junk (Live at Big Day Out, Sydney - 2003)
 Deliverance (Live at Big Day Out, Sydney - 2003)
 The Applecross Wing Commander (Live at The Metro, Sydney - 1996)
 How Much Is Enough (Live at The Metro, Sydney - 1996)

TV performances

 Minor Byrd (Recovery Special, 1996)
 Jewels and Bullets (Denton, 1995)
 Who Put the Devil in You (The Carnival with Roy and HG, 2002)
 Nifty Lil' Number Like You (The Fat, 2003)
 Damage (Rove Live, 2000)
 Baby Clothes (Studio 22, 2001)
 Draggin' Yer Bones (The Gig - Channel V, 2002)
 'Round Ten (The 10:30 Slot, 1999)
Dirty Deeds Done Dirt Cheap with Tex Perkins (Rove Live, 2002)

Bonus material (Gold)

 The Cream & the Crock Documentary (13:27)
 Goddamn (music video)
 The Last Thing You Can Depend Upon (music video)
 Open All Night (music video)
 'Round Ten (music video)
 Recovery Wodonga Civic Centre Interview (2:28)
 Tour Art Gallery

Easter egg material

 Berlin Chair (US version)
 #4 Record TV commercial
 Dress Me Slowly TV commercial
 The Cream & the Crock TV commercial

References 

You Am I video albums
2003 video albums
2003 compilation albums
2003 live albums
Live video albums
Music video compilation albums